The Addison Senate District is one of 16 districts of the Vermont Senate. The current district plan is included in the redistricting and reapportionment plan developed by the Vermont General Assembly following the 2020 U.S. Census, which applies to legislatures elected in 2022, 2024, 2026, 2028, and 2030.

The Addison district includes all of Addison County, Buel's Gore and the Town of Huntington from Chittenden County, and the Town of Rochester from Windsor County.

As of the 2020 census, the state as a whole had a population of 643,077. As there are a total of 30 Senators, there were 21,436 residents per senator.

District Senators

As of 2023
Ruth Hardy, Democrat
Christopher Bray, Democrat(As of 2017)

 Claire D. Ayer, Democrat
 Christopher A. Bray, Democrat

Candidates for 2018
The following information was obtained from the Vermont General Assembly website.

Towns, city, and gore in the Addison district

Addison County 
Addison
Bridport
Bristol
Cornwall
Ferrisburgh
Goshen
Granville
Hancock
Leicester
Lincoln
Middlebury
Monkton
New Haven
Orwell
Panton
Ripton
Salisbury
Shoreham
Starksboro
Vergennes
Waltham
Weybridge
Whiting

Chittenden County
Buel's Gore
Huntington

Windsor County
Rochester

Towns and cities in the Addison district, 2012–2022 elections 
As of the 2010 census, the state as a whole had a population of 625,741. As there are a total of 30 Senators, there were 20,858 residents per senator.

Addison County 

 Addison
 Bridport
 Bristol
 Cornwall
 Ferrisburgh
 Goshen
 Granville
 Hancock
 Leicester
 Lincoln
 Middlebury
 Monkton
 New Haven
 Orwell
 Panton
 Ripton
 Salisbury
 Shoreham
 Starksboro
 Vergennes
 Waltham
 Weybridge
 Whiting

Chittenden County

 Buel's Gore
 Huntington

Towns and cities in the Addison District, 2002–2012 elections 
As of the 2000 census, the state as a whole had a population of 608,827. As there are a total of 30 Senators, there were 20,294 residents per senator.  The Addison District had a population of 39,891 in that same census.  The district is apportioned two senators. This equals 19,946 residents per senator, 1.72% below the state average.

Addison County 

 Addison
 Bridport
 Bristol
 Cornwall
 Ferrisburgh
 Goshen
 Granville
 Hancock
 Leicester
 Lincoln
 Middlebury
 Monkton
 New Haven
 Orwell
 Panton
 Ripton
 Salisbury
 Shoreham
 Starksboro
 Vergennes
 Waltham
 Weybridge
 Whiting

Rutland County 

 Brandon

See also
Addison Vermont Senate District, 2002-2012
Vermont Senate districts, 2012–2022

References

External links

Redistricting information from Vermont Legislature
2002 and 2012 Redistricting information from Vermont Legislature
Map of Vermont Senate districts and statistics (PDF) 2002–2012

Vermont Senate districts